Connected: The Hidden Science of Everything is a 2020 docuseries where journalist Latif Nasser is investigating ways in which we are connected to each other and the universe.

Host 
 Latif Nasser, the director of research at the award-winning New York Public Radio show Radiolab

Episodes

Release 
Connected: The Hidden Science of Everything was released on August 2, 2020, on Netflix.

References

External links 
 
 

2020s American documentary television series
2020 American television series debuts
English-language Netflix original programming
Netflix original documentary television series